The Nesse is a  tributary of the Hörsel in the southern Thuringia. Strictly speaking, it represents a second, right main branch of the Hörsel, which brings about as much water to join the Hörsel as the Hörsel itself and drains an even larger catchment area.

The Nesse is a typical lowland river with an average bed gradient of only about 1.5 ‰. According to the Thuringia Water Act it has the status of a first order watercourse and is therefore under the maintenance obligation of the Free State of Thuringia.

Origin 
The Nesse was formed at the end of the last ice age, geologists assume that a dammed lake with meltwater forced the breakthrough to the west. Neighbouring rivers belong to the Elbe river basin, the watershed of both rivers runs over Alacher Höhe and Bienstädter Höhe.

Course

Source area and upper cours 
In Nottleben, the Mollbach, its first bigger tributary flows from the right, further right tributaries of the upper course flowing further below come from the Fahnersche Höhe.

Lower course 
At the former railway station of Wangenheim the Wilder Graben (Nesse), which is fed in particular by the Leinakanal, flows into the Nesse from Gotha or coming from the left. Here ends the upper course of the Nesse, which up to now has been classified as a water body of 2nd class according to § 3 of the Thuringian Water Act. Up to the estuary the Nesse is a watercourse of the 1st class.
The Wangenheimer See existed in its place until the 18th century. This is the first inflow from the Hainich.

On the left side the river approaches the Hörselberge, from which, however, only very short streams come. Hydrogeological investigations confirmed an underground connection with the Hörsel valley. From Ettenhausen an der Nesse to Stockhausen the Hörsel water feeds a dozen strong karst springs.

In the Wartburgkreis the Nesse flows through the community Hörselberg-Hainich, where in Großenlupnitz the Böber flows from the right and reaches the area of the town Eisenach at Stockhausen. As the last tributary, the Trenkelbach flows into the Nesse at Petersberg.

Confluence 
This originally served to regulate the water level of the Hörsel. Here the  branches off from the Hörsel and diverts about half of its water volume into the medieval mill area on the northern and western edge of Eisenach's old town. The original mouth of the Nesse can still be recognised on historical maps from the 18th century: it was located to the west of Eichhölzchen on what is now Tiefenbacher Allee. The site has been reshaped since the construction of the car factory.

Tributaries 
All Nesse tributaries come from the Thuringian Basin and its marginal plates, while its receiving water Hörsel is largely fed by the montane Thuringian Forest.

Most of the tributaries of the Nesse are typical lowland streams with low gradient. Today, their courses are largely straightened and integrated into a system of drainage ditches. The stream lengths given below each refer approximately to the permanently water-bearing part. Since most of the courses are canalized and integrated into the drainage system up to the corresponding watershed, they temporarily carry water over a much longer length during high precipitation or snowmelt, but in dry seasons they are de facto sometimes much shorter than indicated.

The Leina Channel forms a connection from the Hörsel headwaters —and the (upper) Apfelstädt from the system Gera/Unstrut/Saale/Elbe —to the subsystem of the Nesse. It was already built in the Middle Ages to supply the town Gotha with water from the Thuringian Forest, and to which the Nesse flows via the Wilder Graben. The catchment area of the Wilder Graben is with  barely smaller than that of the Nesse above, in addition there is the proportionate catchment area of Leina (estimated by TLUG Jena to be ) and Apfelstädt.

Ecology and energy production 
Especially in the 1980s, the Nesse was affected by heavy pollution from the confluence of the Wilden Graben. Via the Wilden Graben, insufficiently treated wastewater from the catchment area of the Gotha sewage treatment plant was fed into the river. With the construction of a state-of-the-art sewage treatment plant in Gotha by 1993, the water quality could be decisively improved.

Active hydropower plants are located on the River Nesse in the districts of Ettenhausen, Wenigenlupnitz and Großenlupnitz in the municipality of Hörselberg-Hainich and in Eisenach.

See also
List of rivers of Thuringia

References 

Rivers of Thuringia
Rivers of Germany